In combinatorial mathematics, a Baxter permutation is a permutation  which satisfies the following generalized pattern avoidance property:
 There are no indices i < j < k such that σ(j + 1) < σ(i) < σ(k) < σ(j) or σ(j) < σ(k) < σ(i) < σ(j + 1).
Equivalently, using the notation for vincular patterns, a Baxter permutation is one that avoids the two dashed patterns 2-41-3 and 3-14-2.

For example, the permutation σ = 2413 in S4 (written in one-line notation) is not a Baxter permutation because, taking i = 1, j = 2 and k = 4, this permutation violates the first condition.

These permutations were introduced by Glen E. Baxter in the context of mathematical analysis.

Enumeration 
For n = 1, 2, 3, ..., the number an of Baxter permutations of length n is 
1, 2, 6, 22, 92, 422, 2074, 10754, 58202, 326240, 1882960, 11140560, 67329992, 414499438, 2593341586, 16458756586,... 
This is sequence  in the OEIS.  In general, an has the following formula:

In fact, this formula is graded by the number of descents in the permutations, i.e., there are  Baxter permutations in Sn with k – 1 descents.

Other properties 
 The number of alternating Baxter permutations of length 2n is (Cn)2, the square of a Catalan number, and of length 2n + 1 is CnCn+1.
 The number of doubly alternating Baxter permutations of length 2n and 2n + 1 (i.e., those for which both σ and its inverse σ−1 are alternating) is the Catalan number Cn.
 Baxter permutations are related to Hopf algebras, planar graphs, and tilings.

Motivation: commuting functions
Baxter introduced Baxter permutations while studying the fixed points of commuting continuous functions.  In particular, if f and g are continuous functions from the interval [0, 1] to itself such that f(g(x)) = g(f(x)) for all x, and f(g(x)) = x for finitely many x in [0, 1], then:
 the number of these fixed points is odd; 
 if the fixed points are x1 <  x2 < ... < x2k + 1 then f and g act as mutually-inverse permutations on {x1, x3, ..., x2k + 1} and {x2, x4, ..., x2k};
 the permutation induced by f on {x1, x3, ..., x2k + 1} uniquely determines the permutation induced by f on {x2, x4, ..., x2k};
 under the natural relabeling x1 → 1, x3 → 2, etc., the permutation induced on {1, 2, ..., k + 1} is a Baxter permutation.

See also 
 Enumerations of specific permutation classes

References

External links
 

Permutation patterns